Julius Spearbraker was a member of the Wisconsin State Assembly.

Biography
Spearbraker was born on September 8, 1886 in Clintonville, Wisconsin. He attended Marquette University. Spearbraker died in 1969.

Career
Spearbraker was a member of the Assembly from 1939 to 1950. Previously, he had been Clerk of Clintonville from 1912 to 1934. Additionally, he was a delegate to the Republican National Convention in 1940 and 1944.

References

People from Clintonville, Wisconsin
Republican Party members of the Wisconsin State Assembly
Clerks
Marquette University alumni
1886 births
1969 deaths
20th-century American politicians